The IUPAC/IUPAP Joint Working Party is a group convened periodically by the International Union of Pure and Applied Chemistry (IUPAC) and the International Union of Pure and Applied Physics (IUPAP) to consider claims for discovery and naming of new chemical elements. It is sometimes called the Joint Working Party on Discovery of Elements. The working party's recommendations are voted on by the General Assembly of the IUPAP.

References

Chemistry organizations
Physics organizations
Working groups
Periodic table